Derobrachus thomasi is a species of beetle in the family Cerambycidae. It was described by Santos-Silva in 2007.

References

Prioninae
Beetles described in 2007